Ithaka is a 2021 Australian documentary film, which depicts the incarceration of WikiLeaks founder Julian Assange through the experience of his wife Stella Moris and his father John Shipton. It was produced by his half-brother Gabriel Shipton. It premiered at the Sydney Film Festival on November 7th 2021.

Reception
The film won Best Documentary at the Capricorn Film Festival and Audience Award at the Berlin Human Rights Film Festival.

The Guardian gave it three stars and called it intriguing. The Times gave it three stars and called it fascinating but said it was undone by "John Shipton, through whose eyes the film effectively unfolds." According to The Times, Shipton talked freely "about the geopolitical implications of WikiLeaks and his son’s journalistic idealism" but was "fractious, refuses to answer personal questions and consistently slides into grand, self-regarding, allusion-filled prolixity." The Financial Times gave it three stars but called it "partisan" and "agitprop", saying "the makers’ partiality shows." They described it as "Julian Assange’s story told through the eyes of his family," and that "it is most worthwhile when director Ben Lawrence admits that." The Green Left praised the documentary but noted that "Shipton and Moris are the ones who provide the balancing acts" in the narrative. 

According to Variety, the documentary "is less about the man than the cause" of defending journalism. Variety criticised the documentary's presentation, saying "the whole movie is a kind of family affair... I’m sorry, but family affairs don’t tend to make for good documentaries." Variety wrote that Ithaka "takes a narrow view of Assange’s troubles, one that ultimately merges with a black-and-white view of his politics: He’s right, the American government is wrong" and compared it unfavorably to We Steal Secrets: The Story of WikiLeaks. The Los Angeles Times wrote that Ithaka "isn’t as effective an advocacy doc as it could be, sometimes feeling trapped between wanting to intellectualize with onscreen text and contextualized history and looking for observational moments that crystallize the pain and concern for the Assange family." The Los Angeles Times compared Ithaka unfavorably to Risk's willingness to explore disillusionment with Assange, writing that Ithaka seemed "almost afraid to address controversies that could be argued aren’t as important as what a successful prosecution of Assange ominously portends for journalism."

References

External links 

2021 films
Australian documentary films
2020s English-language films
2021 documentary films
Cultural depictions of Julian Assange